Thomas Hutchison may refer to:
Tom Hutchison (golfer) (1877–1900), Scottish golfer
Tommy Hutchison (born 1947), Scottish footballer (Blackpool, Coventry City, Swansea City etc)
Thomas Hutchison (politician) (1866–1925), Scottish landowner and politician
Thomas Setzer Hutchison (1875–1936), American military officer, civil reformer, author and inventor

See also
Thomas Hutchinson (disambiguation)
Tim Hutchinson (disambiguation)